Carl Siegmund Friedrichs Lachs (1832-1910) was a Bavarian-Swedish brewmaster active in Sweden and the United States.

Friedrichs Lax was born on 9 January 1832 in Altdorf bei Nürnberg, Kingdom of Bavaria. He immigrated to Halmstad, Sweden, in 1860; naturalised as Swedish citizen in 1878. He married Fredrika (née Lorentzon) (1845-1941) in Gothenburg in 1866. Their issue included Charlotte Lachs (1867-1920), singer, Alice Brauner (1877-1944), and Charles Lachs (1879-1979), visual artist.

Friedrichs Lachs was active, including as business partner, initially as brewmaster among others at :sv:Österman & Co, :sv:S:t Eriks Bryggeri, and :sv:Nürnbergs Bryggeri. Subsequently he ventured into :sv:O. Vallmo & Co, :sv:Örebro Bryggeribolag, and :sv:Klosterbryggeriet Ystad; the latter accordingly brewing the first Bavarian beer in Sweden, including to the royal court. Furthermore, he brewed Fred Lax's Columbus Ale in New York City, United States. After relocating to Sweden he founded a yeast factory on Södermalm in Stockholm in 1894.

He died on 17 June 1910 and is buried in Sandsborgskyrkogården.

References

External links
 Beer labels of, among others, O.Wallmo&Co Lindesberg at Samlaren.org 

1832 births
1910 deaths
People from Altdorf bei Nürnberg
German brewers
Swedish brewers
19th-century German businesspeople
20th-century German businesspeople
19th-century Swedish businesspeople
20th-century Swedish businesspeople
Swedish people of German descent